Arnoldo is a masculine given name. Notable people with the name include:

First name
Arnoldo Alemán (born 1946), Nicaraguan politician
Arnoldo José Avilés García (born 1968), Honduran politician
Arnoldo Camu (1937—1973), Chilean lawyer and political activist
Arnoldo Castillo (1922—2005), Argentine politician
Arnoldo Ferreto, Costa Rican politician
Arnoldo Foà (1916–2014), Italian actor
Arnoldo Frigessi (born 1959), Italian statistician and academic
Arnoldo Gabaldón (1909–1990), Venezuelan physician and politician
Arnoldo Granella (1939–2022), French football player
Arnoldo Herrera (born 1996), Costa Rican swimmer
Arnoldo Iguarán (born 1957), Colombian football player
Arnoldo Jimenez (born 1982), American fugitive
Arnoldo López Echandi, Costa Rican politician 
Arnoldo Martínez Verdugo (1925–2013), Mexican politician
Arnaldo Momigliano (1908–1987), Italian historian
Arnoldo Mondadori (1889–1971), Italian publisher
Arnoldo Ochoa González (born 1951), Mexican politician
Arnoldo Parés (born 1922), Argentine boxer
Arnoldo Pekelharing (1936–2001), Argentine sailor 
Arnoldo Penzkofer (1959–2008), Paraguayan basketball player.
Arnoldo Rábago (born 1942), Mexican sailor
Arnoldo Sartorio (1853–1936), German composer
Arnoldo Torres, American journalist

Middle name
Adolfo Arnoldo Majano (born 1938), Salvadoran military and political figure

Italian masculine given names